Hoeve may refer to:

Surnames
Henk ten Hoeve (born 1946), Dutch politician
Jan van der Hoeve (1878-1952), Dutch ophthalmologist

Companies
Ichtiar Baru van Hoeve (established 1980), Indonesian publisher of encyclopedia and reference books

Places
De Hoeve, small village in the Dutch county of Weststellingwerf
Høve, village in northwest Zealand
Paeltronck Hoeve, typical Flemish farm in Ledringhem, Pas-de-Calais, northern France